The University of New Haven (UNH) is a private university in West Haven, Connecticut. Between its main campus in West Haven and its graduate school campus in Orange, Connecticut, the university grounds cover about 122 acres of land. The university is a member of the Northeast-10 Conference and its mascot is a charger, a medieval war horse.

History
The University of New Haven was founded in 1920 as the New Haven YMCA Junior College, a division of Northeastern University, which shared buildings, laboratories, and faculty members at Yale University, for nearly 40 years.

Milestones
1920 – New Haven YMCA Junior College was founded as a branch of Northeastern University.
1923 – First associate degrees awarded
1926 – Received state charter as "New Haven College"
1948 – Received accreditation by the New England Association of Colleges and Secondary Schools
1958 – Received authorization to offer Bachelor of Science degrees in business and engineering
1960 – Moved to West Haven to the site of a former county orphanage, Ellis C. Maxcy Hall
1965 – Constructed Student Center
1966 – Received accreditation for baccalaureate programs
1968 – Constructed engineering building
1969 – Opened graduate school program, constructed first residence hall
1970 – Renamed "University of New Haven"
1971 – Added athletic complex
1974 – Constructed Marvin K. Peterson Library
1975 – Purchased Harugari Hall
1985 – Acquired Arbeiter Maenner Chor
1991 – Constructed new building for admissions
1995 – Relocation of Southeastern Branch to Mitchell College in New London
2012 – Opened the satellite campus in Prato, Italy
2013 – Purchased the Orange Campus
2014 – Annexed the Lyme Academy College of Fine Arts
2018 – Introduced plans for the "Building for Success" campaign including addition of Bergami Center of Science, Technology, and Innovation to campus, upgrades to Dodds Hall, and renovations to residence hall and athletic facilities.
2018 – Announced discontinuation of degree-granting academic offerings at Lyme Academy College of Fine Arts
2019 – Announced that inaugural comprehensive campaign, the Charger Challenge, exceeded its original goal of $100 million, and reset goal at $120 million.
2020 – Opened the Bergami Center for Science, Technology, and Innovation and celebrated 100 years of being an educational institution.

Academics
The University of New Haven has nearly 100 undergraduate programs and 50 graduate programs. Around 33% of students are enrolled in arts and sciences, 21% in business, 12% in engineering, and 34% in criminal justice and forensic sciences.

The University of New Haven is featured in the Princeton Review's 2017 "Best 381 Colleges" guidebook, and the 2021 "The Best 386 Colleges" guidebook. In the previous two years, the university was included in the Princeton Review's "Best in the Northeast" list.

In the 2020 U.S. News & World Report rankings, the University of New Haven was tied for 59th in the regional universities (north) category.

In 2015, the University of New Haven's College of Business received accreditation from AACSB International.

Campus
The University of New Haven currently houses 48 campus buildings, including the Henry C. Lee Institute of Forensic Science – and the newest building, the Bergami Center for Science, Technology, and Innovation. This includes 14 on- and off-campus, university-sponsored residence halls.

Henry C. Lee Institute of Forensic Science

The Henry C. Lee Institute of Forensic Science opened on the campus of the University of New Haven in the fall of 1998. Henry C. Lee has been a member of the UNH faculty since 1975. The institute was dedicated on October 15, 2010, and consists of a crime scene center, crisis management center, museum, laboratories, classrooms, a 104-seat lecture hall, and Lee's office.

The institute is also known for holding multiple lectures and classes throughout the year, all of which are taught by practitioners with forensic experience. Popular and often recurring topics include crime-scene and evidence photography, death and homicide investigation, advanced blood stain and pattern analysis, and many others. It has specialties in interdisciplinary research, training, testing, consulting, and education in forensic science, and is able to accomplish this by housing six centers of excellence:

the National Cold Case Center
the Learning Center
the Forensic and Emergency Crisis Management Command Center
an Advanced Technology Center
the National Crime Scene Training Center
a Research and Training Center

Athletics

The New Haven Chargers, the university's intercollegiate athletic teams, compete in NCAA Division II. The Chargers' 17 athletics teams, 7 for men and 10 for women, compete as members of the Northeast-10 Conference. New Haven has been a member of the NE-10 since 2008.

In 2016–2017, the women's volleyball and baseball team won Northeast-10 Conference championships. Overall, 12 of its 16 teams qualified for postseason play, while six teams (men's and women's cross country, volleyball, baseball, women's lacrosse, and softball) advanced to the NCAA championships. Six Chargers were named All-Americans following their respective seasons; Zach Voytek (football), Tyler Condit (football), Kendall Cietek (women's lacrosse), Nicole Belanger (women's lacrosse), Hannah Johnson (women's lacrosse), and Robert Petrillo (baseball). Off the fields, courts and tracks, the Chargers' 300-plus student-athletes combined for a 3.01 grade point average in the spring of 2017, the 18th straight season with a cumulative GPA of 3.0 or higher. Additionally, 343 Chargers received NE10 Commissioner's Honor Roll accolades, while 163 were named to the New Haven Dean's List.

Varsity teams

Men's sports (8)
Baseball
Basketball
Cross country
Football
Soccer
Track and field (indoor and outdoor)
Golf
Women's sports (10)
Basketball
Cross country
Field Hockey
Lacrosse
Soccer
Softball
Tennis
Track and field (indoor and outdoor)
Volleyball
Rugby
Golf

Club sports 
Twenty-two club sports are recognized at the University of New Haven. Club sports are recreation or athletics student-led organizations that compete with other universities and colleges. Each club is a University of New Haven-recognized student organization and member of a regional or national governing association. Participation and individual dues vary by club. 

Ice Hockey (Women's and Men's)
Lacrosse (Women's and Men's)
Baseball (Men's)
Rugby (Women's and Men's)
Ultimate Frisbee (CoRec)
Field Hockey (CoRec)
Tennis (CoRec)
Soccer (Women's and Men's)
Wrestling (CoRec)
Volleyball (Women's and Men's)

Badminton (Co-Ed)
E-Sports (Co-ed)
Gymnastics (Co-Ed)
Swimming (Co-Ed)
Softball (Women's)
Golf (Co-Ed)
Running (CoRec)

Intramurals sports 
RECSports is an extensive intramural sport program, which provides participants the opportunity to compete and socialize through organized sports leagues, one-day tournaments, special events, and online programs. Over 50 team and individual sport programs are offered throughout the academic year. Access to all RECSports programs is free and open to all University of New Haven students.

Student organizations
University of New Haven had 160 clubs and organizations as of February 2013.

Greek life
Recognized fraternities and sororities at the university include:

Unrecognized Greek organizations

Kappa Sigma (ΚΣ) is a colony fraternity formed on September 9, 2017, operating in the West Haven area. This chapter is not recognized by the University of New Haven.

Undergraduate student government
The Undergraduate Student Government Association at the University of New Haven houses all of the university's recognized student organizations. Offices are located on the top floor of Bartels Hall, the university's student center.

Student Committee of Programming Events
The Student Committee of Programming Events is a student-run programming organization made up of several committees: Spirit and Traditions, Entertainment, Charger Excursions, Film and Technology, Novelty and Variety, and Marketing Chairs.

Student newspaper
The Charger Bulletin is the official, student-run newspaper at the University of New Haven since 1938. It is published weekly in a quarter-folded tabloid format. Both undergraduate and graduate students write for the paper. The Bulletin comes out weekly on Tuesdays while classes are in session. The paper version of the Bulletin is distributed for free throughout the campus of UNH, and is also published online.

Marching band
The University of New Haven Chargers Marching Band (UNHMB) is one of the fastest-growing collegiate marching bands in the country, starting in 2009 with only 20 members and now marching over 260.

The marching band consists of both undergraduate and graduate students from almost every degree program on campus and is the largest organization on campus. Members include those with championship high-school and drum-corps experience, as well as those whose high-school bands did not march at all. The band performs at all home football games, and several high-school competitions throughout Connecticut, and has also traveled to Fitton Stadium at the College of the Holy Cross in Worcester, Massachusetts, and travels yearly to J. Birney Crum Stadium in Allentown, Pennsylvania, most recently to participate in the Collegiate Marching Band Festival.

Yearbook
The Chariot Yearbook is a student-run yearbook at the University of New Haven tasked with producing the university's annual yearbook. Typically the Chariot Yearbook highlights: the graduating class, the recognized student organizations, and several campus wide events and celebrations.

Radio station

The university's noncommercial radio station, WNHU-FM, first signed onto the air at 1600 EDT on July 4, 1973. The WNHU studios moved to its current home on Ruden Street into the Lois Evalyn Bergami Broadcast Media Center in 2015. Its location on Ruden Street includes a production space for live and recorded programming, a server room, staff offices, and a student lounge. WNHU is managed by a 10-person student leadership team. Positions include station manager, promotions director, Aircheck director, WNHU program director, director of fundraising, program/music director, and productions director.  The University of New Haven's communications department started to work with the radio station for students to have access to the station. The station operates as a laboratory for student learning, and as a source of culturally diverse programming for the communities served. 
WNHU is broadcast on 88.7 FM; it is considered the best college radio station in Connecticut according to the New Haven Advocate, which has awarded the station "Best College Radio Station" for over six consecutive years.

WNHU is known for eclectic programming, with shows ranging from new music, rock, gospel, funk, and talk shows to specialty formats such as polka and Irish music. Unlike many college or community radio stations where DJs change frequently, some WNHU personalities have hosted shows for years, many of whom are UNH alumni.

WNHU-2 
Students usually start their time on the station with WNHU-2, the online stream from the University of New Haven. Training for students to start their own show is taught by the WNHU2 Director. As stated on wnhu.org, "An unfiltered sense of creative freedom is what WNHU-2 is all about, so you may encounter explicit language, lyrics, and stories. The views expressed on WNHU-2 are those of our students and our students alone."

Bucknall Theater 
Bucknall Theater was named in honor of William L. Bucknall, Jr who has a passion for theatre and regularly attends shows at the University of New Haven and in New York and London. The theater has about two productions a semester as well as holding several functions for the university throughout the academic year. The space also doubles as a learning space for many of the classes pertaining to the Arts Department, more specifically theatre majors. It is used as a lecture hall and is equipped with pull-out desks on each of the 250 seats.

Black Student Union
The University of New Haven Black Student Union (BSU) was established in 1973 and was the first student organization on the university's campus for students of color. Like most other BSUs on college campuses at that time, UNH's BSU was born out of the civil rights movement and was proactive in generating change on campus, including cultural awareness programs, requesting African-American history courses, and working closely with fraternities and sororities.

On April 6, 2013, the BBSU celebrated its 40th anniversary during the annual Sankofa Ball held during the university's Black and Latino Alumni Weekend.

Notable alumni
The University of New Haven has about 50,000 alumni. Among its notable alumni are:

Ameera al-Taweel, Saudi Arabian royalty
Patrick Arnold, steroid chemistry
Steve Bedrosian, baseball
Harry Boatswain (football)
Dorinda Keenan Borer (politician)
Jamaal Bowman (politician)
Kenton Clarke (CEO, Computer Consulting Associates International Inc.)
Cameron Drew (baseball)
Vivian Davis Figures (politician)
Lubbie Harper Jr., associate justice, Connecticut Supreme Court
Darren M. Haynes, sportscaster for CBS affiliate WUSA9 in Washington, DC
Wayne Johnsen (boxing)
Viren Kapadia (CEO)
Dean Lombardi (former NHL general manager of Los Angeles Kings)
James McCaffrey (actor)
Miles McPherson (football)
Selim Noujaim (politician)
Rob Palmer (TV commentator/sports anchor)
John M. Picard (mayor of West Haven, Connecticut)
Michael J. Rubio (politician)
L. Timothy Ryan (master chef)
Adrian Serioux (soccer)
Tony Sparano (NFL coach)
Roberto Taylor (soccer)
Dave Wallace (baseball)
Erick Russell (politician) Connecticut State Treasurer. First openly gay African American elected to a statewide office in the United States.

Faculty and staff
The student-to-faculty ratio is roughly 16:1, with an average class size of 20 students. The university has nearly 510 staff members and 278 full-time faculty members in addition to part-time and adjunct professors. Of full-time faculty, 84.9% hold the highest degree in their field.

Notable professors
Henry C. Lee (retired, former professor of forensic science) – Worked on famous cases such as the JonBenét Ramsey murder, the Helle Crafts woodchipper murder, the O. J. Simpson and Laci Peterson cases, the post-9/11 forensic investigation, the Beltway sniper shootings, and the reinvestigation of the assassination of John F. Kennedy.
Nikodem Popławski (professor of physics) is most widely noted for the hypothesis that every black hole could be a doorway to another universe and that the universe was formed within a black hole, which itself exists in a larger universe. Popławski has also appeared in an episode of the TV show Through the Wormhole titled "Are There Parallel Universes?" and in an episode of the Discovery Channel show Curiosity titled "Is There a Parallel Universe?", which were hosted by Morgan Freeman and aired in 2011. He was named by Forbes magazine in 2015 as one of five scientists in the world most likely to become the next Albert Einstein. As of 2020, Dr Nikodem Poplawski has published his groundbreaking work on black holes and the multiverse in the journal Foundations of Physics.
Horatio Strother (assistant professor of history) is the author of the authoritative book on the Underground Railroad in Connecticut.

References

External links

 
 New Haven Athletics website
 The Charger Bulletin – student newspaper

 
University of New Haven
University of New Haven
Educational institutions established in 1920
Universities and colleges in New Haven County, Connecticut
Buildings and structures in West Haven, Connecticut
1920 establishments in Connecticut
Universities and colleges founded by the YMCA